Camponotus monju is a species of carpenter ant known from Japan and Taiwan.

References

Insects described in 1999
monju
Hymenoptera of Asia